David L. Robertson is head of bioinformatics and MRC Investigator at the University of Glasgow's Centre for Virus Research.

He earned a BSc from the University of Edinburgh in 1991. He completed a Ph.D. in genetics at the University of Nottingham and Trinity College Dublin.  Subsequently, he was a research associate at the University of Alabama at Birmingham, a research fellow at the CNRS, and a Wellcome Trust Research Fellow at the University of Oxford. In 2002 he became a lecturer and principal investigator at the University of Manchester.  In 2017, he moved to University of Glasgow and became head of the Centre for Virus Research’s bioinformatics research programme. His research focus has been on computational approaches to the study of viruses, molecular evolution, and the analysis of viral diseases such as HIV, COVID-19, and others. 

He is an elected member of the Executive Committee of the International Committee on Taxonomy of Viruses.

References 

Living people
Year of birth missing (living people)
Academics of the University of Glasgow
Virologists
Place of birth missing (living people)

COVID-19 researchers
21st-century British scientists
Academics of the University of Manchester
British bioinformaticians